Dengkil (Chinese: 龍溪) is a town and mukim in Sepang District, southern Selangor, Malaysia.

Geography
The town lies between Cyberjaya to the northwest and the Kuala Lumpur International Airport to the south. It is located just outside Putrajaya's southern border.

There are two well-known rivers in Dengkil, Sungai Semenyih and Sungai Langat, the rivers merge near Jederam Hilir.

See also

References

Sepang District
Mukims of Selangor